Caro is a commune in the Morbihan department of Brittany in north-western France.

Demographics
Inhabitants of Caro are called in French Caroyens.

See also
Communes of the Morbihan department

References

External links

 

Mayors of Morbihan Association 

Communes of Morbihan